Moliets-et-Maa is a commune in the Landes department in Nouvelle-Aquitaine in south-western France.

Description
The principal economic activity is tourism and the village features long sandy beaches and golf courses.

The "courant d'Huchet" flows into the Atlantic Ocean on the Moliets's beach.

See also
Communes of the Landes department

References

External links

 

Molietsetmaa